Eran Malkin (born 22 March 1993) is an Israeli former footballer who played as a midfielder. He was play also for Maccabi Ironi Ashdod.

In October 2018, he retired from football.

References

1993 births
Israeli Jews
Living people
Israeli footballers
Footballers from Northern District (Israel)
People from Tel Adashim
Maccabi Haifa F.C. players
Hapoel Nof HaGalil F.C. players
Maccabi Herzliya F.C. players
Hapoel Herzliya F.C. players
Maccabi Ironi Ashdod F.C. players
Israeli Premier League players
Liga Leumit players
Association football midfielders